A catholicosate or catholicate is a particular ecclesiastical primacy, headed by a primate titled as a catholicos. Such regional primacies exist within various branches of Eastern Christianity, especially those of Oriental Orthodox tradition. The term catholicosate also designates the area of responsibility (territorial or otherwise) of a catholicos. The word is derived from the Greek Καθολικος, meaning "wholeness", and it was used to designate ecclesiastical primacy of some major metropolitan sees.

While a catholicos is sometimes considered to correspond to a bishop in the Roman Catholic and Protestant traditions, a catholicate is typically a larger and more significant organizational division than a bishopric, archdiocese or episcopal see. Catholicates often have distinct cultural traditions established over many centuries.

Within the Armenian Apostolic Church there are two catholicosates: the Mother See of Holy Etchmiadzin in Etchmiadzin, Armenia, and the Catholicosate of the Great House of Cilicia in Antelias, Lebanon. In the 10th century, when lands inhabited by Armenians were devastated by Seljuks, the Armenian church took refuge in Cilicia. In the 15th century, a new catholicos was elected in Etchmiadzin.

While some traditions favor the English language spelling "catholicate", others favor "catholicosate." There is a degree of inconsistency in this regard.  Others spellings, including "catholicossate", are seen as well.

References

Sources
 
 

Oriental Orthodoxy
Episcopacy in Oriental Orthodoxy
Episcopacy in Eastern Orthodoxy